Carmageddon TDR 2000 (also known as Carmageddon: Total Destruction Racing 2000 or Carmageddon 3: TDR 2000 in North America), is a vehicular combat video game. The sequel to Carmageddon II: Carpocalypse Now, it was developed by Torus Games and released in the United Kingdom on September 1, 2000, and on December 14 in North America.

Description 

The title is a homage to the inspiration for the Carmageddon series, Death Race 2000. As with the other games in the series, one of the most controversial aspects was that pedestrians could be killed by immolation (being set on fire) or graphic collisions that could include body ripping. In some countries, the human pedestrians were replaced with zombies - actually only changing the red blood to green slime - but patches were circulated on the internet that reverted the game to its original state.

Another Carmageddon installment would not come until 14 years later, when it came as Carmageddon: Reincarnation.

During development of TDR 2000, SCi hired Tozzer.com to create an online comic based on the Carmageddon video game.

A Game Boy Color version of the game was also slated to be released but was cancelled for unknown reasons.

Expansion pack
The Nosebleed Pack released 2001 was the official expansion pack for TDR2000 adding new vehicles, environments, powerups and improved multiplayer modes with extra maps. It was later released as a free patch. The soundtrack is by Plague and Utah Saints.

Reception

The game received a score of 61.79% from GameRankings and 48 out of 100 from Metacritic.

References

External links
  (archived)
 

2000 video games
Cancelled Game Boy Color games
Fiction about death games
Racing video games
Vehicular combat games
Video game sequels
Video games developed in Australia
Video games with expansion packs
Windows games
Windows-only games
Post-apocalyptic video games
Multiplayer and single-player video games
Xicat Interactive games
Torus Games games